

Top 20 highest ultra prominent mountains in mainland Balkans

This is a list of the top 20 highest ultra prominent mountains in mainland Balkan Peninsula.

Triglav peak (2,864 m, prominence 2,059 m) in the Slovenian Julian Alps is geographically part of the Balkan Peninsula, as it is east of river Soča, but it is not part of the Mountain System of the Balkan Peninsula, but part of the Mountain System of the Alps.

List of peaks and sub-peaks of the Balkans above 2800 m

More extensive list of the highest mountains, in broader sense, in mainland Balkan Peninsula, corresponding highest peaks, and locations

 Rila (Musala, 2,925 m), Bulgaria, highest mountain in Bulgaria and the Balkans
Malyovitsa (2729), Bulgaria
Cherna Polyana (2716), Bulgaria
 Olympus (Mytikas, 2,917 m), highest mountain in Greece
 Pirin (Vihren, 2,915 m), Bulgaria
Polezhan (2851 m)
 Julian Alps (Triglav, 2,864 m), Slovenia
 Maja e Korabit (Mount Korab 2,764 m), highest point in Albania and North Macedonia
Šar Mountains (Titov Vrv, 2,748 m), North Macedonia
Gjallica (2,487 m), Albania
 Maja Jezercë (2,694m), Albania
 Gjeravicë/Đeravica (2,656m), Kosovo, Serbia
 Majet e Zabores, Maja Grykat e Hapëta (2,625 m), Albania
 Maja e Poplukes (2,569 m), Albania
 Maja e Radohimes, 2,568 m, Albania
 Maja e Kollates (2,556 m), Albania
 Maja e Rosit (2,524 m), Albania and Montenegro
 Smolikas part of Pindos (Smolikas peak, 2,637 m), Greece
 Baba Mountain (Pelister, 2,601 m), North Macedonia
 Jakupica (Solunska Glava, 2,540 m), North Macedonia
 Durmitor (Bobotov Kuk, 2,523), Montenegro
 Voras/Nidže (2,521 m), North Macedonia and Greece
 Gramos (2,520 m), Albania
 Gjallica (2,486 m), Albania
 Nemërçkë (Maja e Papingut - 2,485 m), Albania
 Parnassus (2,460 m), Greece
 Tomorr (Çuka e Partizanit - 2,416 m), Albania
 Shkelzen (2,407 m), Albania
 Hajla (2,403 m), Montenegro
 Maglić (2,386 m), Bosnia and Herzegovina
 Koritnik (2,397 m), Albania
 Ostrovicë (2,383 m), Albania
 Balkan Mountains, Kaloferska Mountain (Botev Peak, 2,376 m), Bulgaria
Zlatishko-Tetevenska Mountain (Vezhen Peak, 2,198 m), Bulgaria
Chiprovska Mountain (Midžor, 2,169 m)
Berkovska Mountain (Kom Peak, 2,016 m), Bulgaria
 Velivar (2,375 m), North Macedonia and Albania
 Ostrovice (2,362 m), Albania
 Valamare (2,350 m), Albania
 Vitosha (Cherni Vrah, 2,290 m) Bulgaria
 Mali i Thate (2,288 m), Albania
 Stogovo (Golem Rid, 2,278 m), North Macedonia
 Jablanice (Maja e Zeze, 2,257 m), North Macedonia and Albania
 Galičica (Magaro, 2,254 m), North Macedonia and Albania
 Osogovo (Ruen, 2,251 m), North Macedonia and Bulgaria
 Mali i Dejes (2,246 m), Albania
 Čvrsnica (2,238 m), Dinarides, Bosnia and Herzegovina
 Shebenik (2,225 m), Albania
 Maje e Harapit (2,217 m), Albania
 Slavyanka (mountain) (Gotsev Vrah, 2,212 m), Bulgaria
 Rhodopes (Golyam Perelik, 2,191 m), Bulgaria
Batashka Mountain (Golyama Syutkya, 2,185 m), Bulgaria
 Maja e Kulamkes (2,177 m), Albania
 Kožuf/Tzena (Zelenbeg, 2,171 m), North Macedonia and Greece
 Mali i Kallabakut (2,171 m), Albania
 Midžor (2,169 m), Serbia
 Bistra (Medenica, 2,163 m), North Macedonia
 Mokra Gora (Pogled, 2,156 m), Serbia
 Prenj (Zelena Glava, 2,155 m), Dinarides, Bosnia and Herzegovina
 Cajup (2,145 m), Albania
 Maja e Kendrevices (2,120 m), Albania
 Kunora e Lures (2,120 m), Albania
 Mali i Allamanit (2,103m), Albania
 Prenj (Lupoglav, 2,102 m), Dinarides, Bosnia and Herzegovina
 Mali i Kreshtes (2,102 m), Albania
 Guri i Zi (2,071 m), Albania
 Bjelašnica (2,067 m), Bosnia and Herzegovina
 Čeloica (Dobra Voda, 2,062 m), North Macedonia
 Maja e Rrunjes (2,056 m), Albania
 Çika (2,045 m), is the highest peak of the Ceraunian Mountains Albania
 Belasica (Radomir peak, 2,029 m), Bulgaria and Greece
 Mali i Lopes (2,022 m), Albania
 Maja e Qorres (2,018 m), Albania
 Kopaonik (Pančićev vrh 2,017 m), Serbia
 Panachaicus (1,926 m), northernmost mountain of the Peloponnese, east of Patras, Greece
 Vlahina (1,924 m), Bulgaria/North Macedonia
 Besna Kobila (1,923 m), Serbia
 Dinara (Troglav peak 1,913 m; Dinara peak 1,831 m), Dinarides, Croatia-Bosnia and Herzegovina
 Orjen (1,894 m), highest mountain in littoral Montenegro, during glacial periods the most heavily glaciated Mediterranean mountain
 Ainos (1,628 m), Greece
 Sredna Gora (1,604 m), Bulgaria
 Igman (1,502 m), Bosnia and Herzegovina
 Zlatibor (Tornik 1,496 m; Čigota 1,422 m), Serbia
 Parnitha (1,413 m), Athens, Greece
 Plana (1,338 m), Bulgaria
 Penteli (1,109 m), Athens, Greece
 Hymettus (1,026 m), east of Athens, Greece
 Sakar (Vishegrad, 895 m), Bulgaria

See also
List of mountains in Albania
List of mountains in Bosnia and Herzegovina
List of mountains in Bulgaria
List of mountains in Croatia
List of mountains in Greece
List of mountains in Kosovo
List of mountains in Montenegro
List of mountains in North Macedonia
List of mountains in Serbia
List of mountains in Slovenia
Most isolated major summits of Europe
List of European ultra-prominent peaks
List of the highest European ultra-prominent peaks
Southernmost glacial mass in Europe
List of highest points of European countries
Greek names of mountains

References

Mountains
Balkans
Environment of the Balkans